This is an incomplete list of earthquakes in the U.S state of Montana. Only earthquakes with a magnitude of 6.0 or greater are listed. Aftershocks are not included, unless they were of great significance or contributed to a death toll.

Earthquakes

See also
List of earthquakes in the United States
List of earthquakes in Utah
List of earthquakes in Nevada

References

 
Montana
Earthquakes